In mathematics, Kachurovskii's theorem is a theorem relating the convexity of a function on a Banach space to the monotonicity of its Fréchet derivative.

Statement of the theorem
Let K be a convex subset of a Banach space V and let f : K → R ∪ {+∞} be an extended real-valued function that is Fréchet differentiable with derivative df(x) : V → R at each point x in K. (In fact, df(x) is an element of the continuous dual space V∗.) Then the following are equivalent:

 f is a convex function;
 for all x and y in K,

 df is an (increasing) monotone operator, i.e., for all x and y in K,

References

 
   (Proposition 7.4)

Convex analysis
Theorems in functional analysis